New Maryland-Sunbury is a provincial electoral district for the Legislative Assembly of New Brunswick, Canada.

History
It was created in 1994 as a totally new district taking in large parts of York South and Sunbury as well as small pieces of several other districts.  In the 2006 redistribution of districts, it lost the community of Lincoln due to the rapid growth of both Lincoln and the village of New Maryland, both bedroom communities for Fredericton.

Also in 2006, the legislature decided to change the name from New Maryland to New Maryland-Sunbury West to reflect that the district contains much more than just the community of New Maryland.

The district expanded eastward in 2013 to take in most of southern Sunbury County, including the Geary area.  It was accordingly renamed New Maryland-Sunbury

Members of the Legislative Assembly

Election results

New Maryland-Sunbury

New Maryland-Sunbury West

New Maryland

* This was a new riding created largely out of the former ridings of York South and Sunbury, both of which were held by CoR prior to the election.  White was the incumbent from Sunbury.

References

External links 
Website of the Legislative Assembly of New Brunswick

New Brunswick provincial electoral districts